The cabinet of Constantin Argetoianu was the government of Romania from 28 September to 23 November 1939.

Ministers
The ministers of the cabinet were as follows:

President of the Council of Ministers:
Constantin Argetoianu (28 September - 23 November 1939)
Minister of the Interior:
Nicolae Ottescu (28 September - 23 November 1939)
Minister of Foreign Affairs: 
Grigore Gafencu (28 September - 23 November 1939)
Minister of Finance:
Mitiță Constantinescu (28 September - 23 November 1939)
Minister of Justice:
Victor Iamandi (28 September - 23 November 1939)
Minister of National Defence:
Gen. Ioan Ilcuș (28 September - 23 November 1939)
Minister of Air and Marine:
Gen. Paul Teodorescu (28 September - 23 November 1939)
Minister of Materiel:
Victor Slăvescu (28 September - 23 November 1939)
Minister of National Economy:
Ion Bujoiu (28 September - 23 November 1939)
Minister of Agriculture and Property
Nicolae Cornățeanu (28 September - 23 November 1939)
Minister of National Education:
Petre Andrei (28 September - 23 November 1939)
Minister of Religious Affairs and the Arts:
Nicolae Zigre (28 September - 23 November 1939)
Minister of Labour:
Mihail Ralea (28 September - 23 November 1939)
Minister of Health and Social Security
Gen. Nicolae Marinescu (28 September - 23 November 1939)
Minister of Public Works and Communications:
Mihail Ghelmegeanu (28 September - 23 November 1939)
Minister of Public Order:
Gabriel Marinescu (28 September - 23 November 1939)
Minister of Propaganda:
Alexandru Radian (28 September - 23 November 1939)
Minister of Public Wealth:
Traian Pop (28 September - 23 November 1939)
Minister in charge of the National Renaissance Front:
Constantin C. Giurăscu (28 September - 23 November 1939)
Minister of State for Minorities:
Silviu Dragomir (28 September - 23 November 1939)

References

Cabinets of Romania
Cabinets established in 1939
Cabinets disestablished in 1939
1939 establishments in Romania
1939 disestablishments in Romania